The Corps of Royal Marines (RM), also known as the Royal Marines Commandos, are the UK's special operations capable commando force, amphibious light infantry and also one of the five fighting arms of the Royal Navy. The Corps of Royal Marines can trace their origins back to the formation of the "Duke of York and Albany's maritime regiment of Foot" on 28 October 1664, and can trace their commando origins to the formation of the 3rd Special Service Brigade, now known as 3 Commando Brigade on 14 February 1942, during the Second World War.

As a specialised and adaptable light infantry and commando force, Royal Marine Commandos are trained for rapid deployment worldwide and capable of dealing with a wide range of threats. The Corps of Royal Marines is organised into 3 Commando Brigade and a number of separate units, including 47 Commando (Raiding Group) Royal Marines, and a company-strength commitment to the Special Forces Support Group. The Corps operates in all environments and climates, though particular expertise and training is spent on raiding, amphibious warfare, arctic warfare, mountain warfare, expeditionary warfare, and its commitment to the UK's rapid reaction forces.

Throughout its history, the Royal Marines have seen action in a number of major wars – including the Seven Years' War, the Napoleonic Wars, the Crimean War, World War I and World War II. The Corps has been largely deployed in expeditionary warfare roles in conflicts such as the Falklands War, the Gulf War, the Bosnian War, the Kosovo War, the Sierra Leone Civil War, the Iraq War and the War in Afghanistan. The Corps of Royal Marines has close international ties with allied marine forces, particularly the United States Marine Corps and the Netherlands Marine Corps. The Royal Marines Commandos have undergone many changes over time.

History

The Royal Marines traces its origins back to 28 October 1664 when at the grounds of the Honourable Artillery Company the Duke of York and Albany's Maritime Regiment of Foot was formed.

Early British Empire
On 5 April 1755, His Majesty's Marine Forces, fifty Companies in three Divisions, headquartered at Chatham, Portsmouth, and Plymouth, were formed by Order of Council under Admiralty control. Initially Marine field officer ranks were honorary sinecure positions awarded to senior Royal Navy officers. This meant that the furthest a Marine officer could advance was to lieutenant colonel. It was not until 1771 that the first Marine was promoted to colonel. This attitude persisted well into the 1800s. During the rest of the 18th century, they served in numerous landings all over the world, the most famous being the landing at Belle Île on the Brittany coast in 1761. They also served in the American War of Independence, notably in the Battle of Bunker Hill led by Major John Pitcairn.

In 1788 a detachment of four companies of marines, under Major Robert Ross, accompanied the First Fleet to protect a new colony at Botany Bay (New South Wales). Due to an error the Fleet left Portsmouth without its main supply of ammunition, and were not resupplied until the Fleet docked in Rio de Janeiro midway through the voyage. Some scholars contend that the Marines deliberately spread smallpox among Australia's Indigenous population in order to protect the settlement, but this incident does not appear in contemporaneous Marine or government records and most researchers associate the disease outbreak with other causes.

In 1802, largely at the instigation of Admiral the Earl St Vincent, they were titled the Royal Marines by King George III. The Royal Marines Artillery (RMA) was formed as a separate unit in 1804 to man the artillery in bomb ketches. These had been manned by the Army's Royal Regiment of Artillery, but a lawsuit by a Royal Artillery officer resulted in a court decision that Army officers were not subject to Naval orders. As RMA uniforms were the blue of the Royal Regiment of Artillery they were nicknamed the "Blue Marines" and the infantry element, who wore the red uniforms of the British infantry, became known as the "Red Marines", often given the semi-derogatory nickname "Lobsters" by sailors. A fourth division of the Royal Marines, headquartered at Woolwich, was formed in 1805.

During the Napoleonic Wars the Royal Marines participated in every notable naval battle on board the Royal Navy's ships and also took part in multiple amphibious actions. Marines had a dual function aboard ships of the Royal Navy in this period; routinely, they ensured the security of the ship's officers and supported their maintenance of discipline in the ship's crew, and in battle, they engaged the enemy's crews, whether firing from positions on their own ship, or fighting in boarding actions. In the Caribbean theatre volunteers from freed French slaves on Marie-Galante were used to form Sir Alexander Cochrane's first Corps of Colonial Marines. These men bolstered the ranks, helping the British to hold the island until reinforcements arrived. This practice was repeated during the War of 1812, where escaped American slaves were formed into Cochrane's second Corps of Colonial Marines. These men were commanded by Royal Marines officers and fought alongside their regular Royal Marines counterparts at the Battle of Bladensburg. Throughout the war Royal Marines units raided up and down the east coast of America including up the Penobscot River and in the Chesapeake Bay. They fought in the Battle of New Orleans and later helped capture Fort Bowyer in Mobile Bay in what was the last action of the war.

In 1855 the infantry forces were renamed the Royal Marines Light Infantry (RMLI). During the Crimean War in 1854 and 1855, three Royal Marines earned the Victoria Cross, two in the Crimea and one in the Baltic. In 1862 the name was slightly altered to Royal Marine Light Infantry. The Royal Navy did not fight any other ships after 1850 and became interested in landings by Naval Brigades. In these Naval Brigades, the function of the Royal Marines was to land first and act as skirmishers ahead of the sailor infantry and artillery. This skirmishing was the traditional function of light infantry. For most of their history, British Marines had been organised as fusiliers. In the rest of the 19th Century the Royal Marines served in many landings especially in the First and Second Opium Wars (1839–1842 and 1856–1860) against the Chinese. These were all successful except for the landing at the Mouth of the Peiho in 1859, where Admiral Sir James Hope ordered a landing across extensive mud flats.

The Royal Marines also played a prominent role in the Boxer Rebellion in China (1900), where a Royal Marine earned a Victoria Cross.

Status and roles
Through much of the 18th and 19th centuries Marine officers had a lower standing status than their counterparts in the Royal Navy. A short-lived
effort was made in 1907, through the common entry or "Selborne scheme", to reduce the professional differences between RN and RM officers through a system of common entry that provided for an initial period of shared training.

By the early twentieth century the Royal Marines had achieved a high professional status, although there was a serious shortage of junior officers. Numbering about 15,000 during the Edwardian era, enlistment for other ranks was for at least 12 years, with entitlement to a pension after 21 years of service. After basic training new recruits were assigned to one of three land-based divisions and from there to warships as vacancies arose. From 1908 onwards one gun turret on each battleship was manned by RMA gunners. The RMLI continued their traditional role of providing landing parties and shore-based detachments. Specialist positions on board ship, such as postmen, barbers, lamp trimmers and butchers, were reserved for Royal Marines. After 1903 the Royal Marines provided bands for service on board battleships and other large vessels.

World wars

First World War
During the First World War, in addition to their usual stations aboard ship, Royal Marines were part of the Royal Naval Division which landed in Belgium in 1914 to help defend Antwerp and later took part in the amphibious landing at Gallipoli in 1915. It also served on the Western Front. The Division's first two commanders were Royal Marine Artillery Generals. Other Royal Marines acted as landing parties in the Naval campaign against the Turkish fortifications in the Dardanelles before the Gallipoli landing. They were sent ashore to assess damage to Turkish fortifications after bombardment by British and French ships and, if necessary, to complete their destruction. The Royal Marines were the last to leave Gallipoli, replacing both British and French troops in a neatly planned and executed withdrawal from the beaches.

The Royal Marines also took part in the Zeebrugge Raid in 1918. Five Royal Marines earned the Victoria Cross in the First World War, two at Zeebrugge, one at Gallipoli, one at Jutland and one on the Western Front.

Between the wars
After the war Royal Marines took part in the allied intervention in Russia. In 1919, the 6th Battalion RMLI mutinied and was disbanded at Murmansk. The Royal Marine Artillery (RMA) and Royal Marine Light Infantry (RMLI) were amalgamated on 22 June 1923. Post-war demobilisation had seen the Royal Marines reduced from 55,000 (1918) to 15,000 in 1922 and there was Treasury pressure for a further reduction to 6,000 or even the entire disbandment of the Corps. As a compromise an establishment of 9,500 was settled upon but this meant that two separate branches could no longer be maintained. The abandonment of the Marine's artillery role meant that the Corps would subsequently have to rely on Royal Artillery support when ashore, that the title of Royal Marines would apply to the entire Corps and that only a few specialists would now receive gunnery training. As a form of consolation the dark blue and red uniform of the Royal Marine Artillery now became the full dress of the entire Corps. Royal Marine officers and SNCO's however continue to wear the historic scarlet in mess dress to the present day. The ranks of private, used by the RMLI, and gunner, used by the RMA, were abolished and replaced by the rank of Marine.

Second World War

During the Second World War, a small party of Royal Marines were first ashore at Namsos in April 1940, seizing the approaches to the Norwegian town preparatory to a landing by the British Army two days later. The Royal Marines formed the Royal Marine Division as an amphibiously trained division, parts of which served at Dakar and in the capture of Madagascar. After the assault on the French naval base at Antsirane in Madagascar was held up, fifty Sea Service Royal Marines from  commanded by Captain Martin Price were landed on the quay of the base by the destroyer  after it ran the gauntlet of French shore batteries defending Diego Suarez Bay. They then captured two of the batteries, which led to a quick surrender by the French.

In addition the Royal Marines formed Mobile Naval Base Defence Organisations (MNBDOs) similar to the United States Marine Corps Defense Battalions. One of these took part in the defence of Crete. Royal Marines also served in Malaya and in Singapore, where due to losses they were joined with remnants of the 2nd Battalion of Argyll and Sutherland Highlanders at Tyersall Park to form the "Plymouth Argylls". The Royal Marines formed one Commando (A Commando) which served at Dieppe. One month after Dieppe, most of the 11th Royal Marine Battalion was killed or captured in an ill staged amphibious landing at Tobruk in Operation Agreement. Again, the Marines were involved with the Argyll and Sutherland Highlanders, this time the 1st Battalion. In 1942 the Infantry Battalions of the Royal Marine Division were re-organised as Commandos, joining the British Army Commandos. The Division command structure became a Special Service Brigade command. The support troops became landing craft crew and saw extensive action on D-Day in June 1944.

A total of four Special Service Brigades (redesignated Commando brigades in December 1944 as the "SS" abbreviation was unpopular) were raised during the war, and Royal Marines were represented in all of them. A total of nine RM Commandos (Battalions) were raised during the war, numbered from 40 to 48. 1 Commando Brigade had just one RM Battalion, No 45 Commando. 2 Commando Brigade had two RM battalions, Nos 40 and 43 Commandos. 3 Commando Brigade also had two, Nos 42 and 44 Commandos. 4 Commando Brigade was entirely Royal Marine after March 1944, comprising Nos 41, 46, 47 and 48 Commandos. 1 Commando Brigade took part in first in the Tunisia Campaign and then assaults on Sicily and Normandy, campaigns in the Rhineland and crossing the Rhine. 2 Commando Brigade was involved in the Salerno landings, Anzio, Comacchio, and operations in the Argenta Gap. 3 Commando Brigade served in Sicily and Burma. 4 Commando Brigade served in the Battle of Normandy and in the Battle of the Scheldt on the island of Walcheren during the clearing of Antwerp.

In January 1945, two further RM Brigades were formed, 116th Brigade and 117th Brigade. Both were conventional Infantry, rather than in the Commando role. 116th Brigade saw some action in the Netherlands, but 117th Brigade was hardly used operationally. In addition one Landing Craft Assault (LCA) unit was stationed in Australia late in the war as a training unit. In 1946 the Army Commandos were disbanded, leaving the Royal Marines to continue the Commando role (with supporting Army elements). A number of Royal Marines served as pilots during the Second World War. It was a Royal Marines officer who led the attack by a formation of Blackburn Skuas that sank the Königsberg. Eighteen Royal Marines commanded Fleet Air Arm squadrons during the course of the war, and with the formation of the British Pacific Fleet were well represented in the final drive on Japan. Captains and Majors generally commanded squadrons, whilst in one case Lt Colonel R.C. Hay on HMS Indefatigable was Air Group Co-ordinator from HMS Victorious of the entire British Pacific Fleet.

Throughout the war Royal Marines continued in their traditional role of providing ships detachments and manning a proportion of the guns on Cruisers and Capital Ships. They also provided the crew for the UK's Minor Landing craft, and the Royal Marines Armoured Support Group manned Centaur IV tanks on D Day; one of these is still on display at Pegasus Bridge.

Only one marine (Corporal Thomas Peck Hunter of 43 Commando) was awarded the Victoria Cross in the Second World War for action at Lake Comacchio in Italy. Hunter was the most recent RM Commando to be awarded the medal. The Royal Marines Boom Patrol Detachment under Blondie Haslar carried out Operation Frankton and provided the basis for the post-war continuation of the SBS.

Post-colonial era
The Corps underwent a notable change after 1945 however, when the Royal Marines took on the main responsibility for the role and training of the British Commandos. , since their creation in 1942 Royal Marines Commandos had engaged on active operations across the globe, every year except 1968. Notably they were the first ever military unit to perform an air assault insertion by helicopter, during the Suez Crisis in 1956. They were also part of the land element during the 1982 Falklands War.

43 Commando was active as amphibious infantry from 1961–68, and 41 Commando was disbanded in 1981.

Cold War 

During the Cold War the Royal Marines were earmarked to reinforce NATO's northernmost command Allied Forces North Norway. Therefore, 3 Commando Brigade began to train annually in Northern Norway and had large stores of vehicles and supplies pre-positioned there. At the end of the Cold War in 1989 the structure of the Royal Marines was as follows:

 Commandant General Royal Marines, London 
 3 Commando Brigade, Plymouth
 40 Commando, Taunton
 42 Commando, Bickleigh
 45 Commando, Arbroath
 29 Commando Regiment, Royal Artillery, Plymouth, one battery in Arbroath, (18× L118 light guns)
 4 Assault Squadron, Plymouth (4× LCU Mk.9, 4× LCVP Mk.4, 2× Centurion BARV), served aboard 
 539 Assault Squadron, Plymouth (4× LCU Mk.9, 4× LCVP Mk.4, 2× Centurion BARV), served aboard 
 59 Independent Commando Squadron, Royal Engineers, Plymouth, one troop in Arbroath
 3 Commando Brigade Air Squadron, RNAS Yeovilton, (12× Gazelle AH.1, 6× Lynx AH.1)
 2 Raiding Squadron, Royal Marines (Reserve), Plymouth
 131 Independent Commando Squadron, Royal Engineers (V), Plymouth
 289 Commando Battery, Royal Artillery (V), Plymouth (6× L118 light guns)
 Special Boat Service, Poole, under operational control of United Kingdom Special Forces
 Comacchio Group, HMNB Clyde, guarded HMNB Clyde and the UK's naval nuclear weapons stored at RNAD Coulport
 Royal Marines Police, Plymouth
 Commando Training Centre Royal Marines, Lympstone
 Royal Marines Band Service RMSoM, Deal
 Royal Marines Reserve 
 RMR Plymouth, Plymouth
 RMR Bristol, Bristol
 RMR London, Wandsworth
 RMR Merseyside, Liverpool
 RMR Scotland, Edinburgh
 RMR Tyne, Newcastle

Note: "(V)" denotes British Army reserve units.

Current status and deployment

Personnel

The Royal Marines Commandos are an elite fighting force, they are part of the Naval Service and under the full command of the Fleet Commander. The rank structure of the Corps is similar to that of the British Army. Uniquely, in the Royal Marines, officers and all other ranks undergo initial, commando and specialist training together at the Commando Training Centre, Royal Marines (CTCRM). Since 2017 there has been no restriction on women applying, though as of 2022 none have passed the training. On average, 26,000 people apply to join the Royal Marines Commandos every year, but only 400 make it. 

At its height in 1944 during the Second World War, more than 70,000 people served in the Royal Marines. Following the Allied victory the Royal Marines were quickly reduced to a post-war strength of 13,000. When National Service was ended in 1960, the Marines were again reduced, but this time to an all Commando-trained force of 9,000 personnel. As of 1 January 2021, the Royal Marines had a strength of 5,968 Regulars, and a combined strength of 6,500 when including reserves. The Royal Marines are also the only British naval unit capable of conducting amphibious operations at brigade level.

Equipment

 Light weapons The basic personal weapons of the Royal Marines Commandos are the C8 carbine rifle and L85A2 assault rifle, sometimes fitted with the L123A3 underslung grenade launcher. Support fire is provided by the L110A1 light machine gun, the L7A2 General Purpose Machine Gun (GPMG) and the L111A1 heavy machine gun (which is often mounted on an armoured vehicle); indirect fire by the L16A2 81mm mortar. Sniper rifles used include the L115A3, produced by Accuracy International. More recently the L129A1 has come into service as the designated marksman rifle. Other weapons include the Javelin Anti-Tank missile, the L131A1 pistol and the Fairbairn–Sykes fighting knife. The Royal Marines will replace all their L85 rifles with a variant of the L119, a variant of the C8SFW.
 Armour The Royal Marines maintain no heavy armoured units, instead, they operate a fleet of lightly armoured and highly mobile vehicles intended for amphibious landings or rapid deployment. The primary armoured fighting vehicle operated by the Armoured Support Group is the BvS 10 Viking All Terrain Armoured Vehicle. Other, lighter vehicles include the Land Rover Wolf Armoured Patrol Vehicle, the Jackal (MWMIK) Armoured Vehicle and the Pinzgauer High Mobility All-Terrain Vehicle.
 Artillery Field artillery support is provided by 29th Commando Regiment Royal Artillery of the British Army using the L118 Light Gun, a 105 mm towed howitzer. The regiment is Commando-trained.
 Aviation The Commando Helicopter Force of the Fleet Air Arm provides transport helicopters in support of the Royal Marines. It currently uses both Merlin HC4/4A medium-lift transport and Wildcat AH1 light transport/reconnaissance helicopters to provide direct aviation support for the Corps. In addition, the Royal Air Force provides Chinook heavy-lift and Puma HC2 medium-lift transport helicopters.
 Vessels The Royal Marines operate a varied fleet of military watercraft designed to transport troops and materiel from ship to shore or conduct river or estuary patrols. These include the 2000TDX Landing Craft Air Cushion, the Mk10 Landing Craft Utility, the Mk5 Landing Craft Vehicle Personnel and the SDV Mk8 Mod 1 Swimmer Delivery Vehicle for special forces. Other smaller amphibious craft such as the Offshore Raiding Craft, Rigid Raider and Inflatable Raiding Craft are in service in much greater numbers.

Formation and structure
The overall head of the Royal Marines is King Charles III, in his role as Commander-in-Chief of the British Armed Forces. The ceremonial head of the Royal Marines is the Captain General Royal Marines (equivalent to the Colonel-in-Chief of a British Army regiment). In October 2022 King Charles was announced as the new Captain General on the occasion of the 358th anniversary of the foundation of the corps. Full Command of the Royal Marines is vested in the Fleet Commander (FLTCDR) with the Commandant General Royal Marines, a major-general, embedded within the Navy Command Headquarters (NCHQ) as Commander UK Amphibious Force (COMUKAMPHIBFOR).

The operational capability of the corps comprises a number of battalion-plus sized units, of which five are designated as "commandos":

Commando Units
 40 Commando, Royal Marines (known as Forty Commando) based at Norton Manor Barracks, Taunton, Somerset, England
 42 Commando, Royal Marines (known as Four Two Commando) based at Bickleigh Barracks, Plymouth, Devon, England
 45 Commando, Royal Marines (known as Four Five Commando) based at RM Condor, Arbroath, Angus, Scotland
Maritime Security
 43 Commando Fleet Protection Group, Royal Marines based at HM Naval Base Clyde, Helensburgh, Argyll and Bute (previously Comacchio Group).
Intelligence, Surveillance and Target Acquisition
 30 Commando (Information Exploitation) Group, Royal Marines based at Stonehouse Barracks, Plymouth
 Brigade Patrol Troop
Raiding and Assault
 47 Commando (Raiding Group), Royal Marines based at RM Tamar, Devonport (previously 1 Assault Group RM)
 Royal Marines Armoured Support Group (RMASG) is an element of the Royal Marines that operates the Viking BvS 10 All Terrain Vehicle. It is based at RNAS Yeovilton in Somerset, and is part of 539 Raiding Squadron.
Logistic Support
 Commando Logistic Regiment based at RM Chivenor, Devon
Special Forces
Special Boat Service based at RM Poole, Dorset (although Full Command is retained by CINCFLEET, Operational Command of SBS RM is assigned to Director Special Forces).
 Royal Marines Vanguard Strike Company, forming up in 2020 as a strike reaction force

With the exception of the 43 Commando Fleet Protection Group and Commando Logistic Regiment, which are each commanded by a full colonel, each of these units is commanded by a lieutenant-colonel of the Royal Marines, who may have sub-specialised in a number of ways throughout their career.

3 Commando Brigade

Operational command of the five commandos and the Commando Logistics Regiment is delegated to 3 Commando Brigade Royal Marines, of which they are a part. Based at Stonehouse Barracks, the brigade exercises control as directed by either CINCFLEET or the Permanent Joint Headquarters. 30 Commando Information Exploitation Group is a battalion-sized formation providing information operations capabilities, life support and security for the Brigade Headquarters.

43 Commando Fleet Protection Group Royal Marines, responsible for the security of the United Kingdom's nuclear deterrent and other security-related duties was originally outside the brigade, but was incorporated into it from April 2012. It also provides specialist boarding parties and snipers for the Royal Navy worldwide, for roles such as embargo enforcement, counter-narcotics, counter-piracy and counter-insurgency activities of the Royal Navy. It is the largest unit in the brigade, at 790 strong.

Independent elements
The independent elements of the Royal Marines are:

 Commando Training Centre: This is the training unit for the entire corps, and consists of three separate sections:
 Commando Training Wing: This is the initial basic commando training section for new recruits to the Royal Marines, and the UK Forces All Arms Commando Course.
 Specialist Wing: This provides specialist training in the various trades which Marines may elect to join once qualified and experienced in a Rifle Company.
 Command Wing: This provides command training for both officers and NCOs of the Royal Marines.
 47 Commando (Raiding Group) Royal Marines: Provides training in the use of landing craft and boats, and also serves as a parent unit for the three assault squadrons permanently embarked on the Royal Navy's amphibious ships.
 4 Assault Squadron—
 Special Boat Service (SBS) are naval special forces and under operational command of Director Special Forces, UK Special Forces Group. It is commanded by a lieutenant colonel qualified as a swimmer canoeist. SBS responsibilities include water-borne operations, maritime counter-terrorism and other special forces tasks.
 Royal Marines Band Service provides regular bands for the Royal Navy and provides expertise to train RN Volunteer Bands. Musicians have an important secondary roles as medics, field hospital orderlies, CBRN specialists and any other roles that may be required of them. Personnel may not be commando trained, usually wearing the dark blue beret instead of green; until 2017, the band service was the only branch of the Royal Marines to admit women.

Structure of a commando

40 and 45 Commando are each organised into six companies, further organised into platoon-sized troops, as follows:

 Command company
 Main HQ
 Tactical HQ
 Reconnaissance Troop with a sniper section
 Mortar Troop
 Anti-Tank (AT) Troop
 Medium Machine Gun Troop
 2× Close Combat Companies
 Company Headquarters
 3× Close Combat Troops
 2× Stand Off Companies
 Company Headquarters
 Heavy Machine Gun (HMG) Troop
 AT Troop
 Close Combat Troop.
 Logistic Company
 A Echelon 1
 A Echelon 2
 FRT (Forward Repair Team)
 RAP (Regimental Aid Post)
 B Echelon

In general a rifle company Marine will be a member of a four-man fire team, the building block of commando operations. A Royal Marine works with their team in the field and shares accommodation if living in barracks. This structure is a recent development, formerly Commandos were structured similarly to British Army light infantry battalions.

Amphibious Task Group

Formerly known as the Amphibious Ready Group, the Amphibious Task Group (ATG) is a mobile, balanced amphibious warfare force, based on a Commando Group and its supporting assets, that can be kept at high readiness to deploy into an area of operations. The ATG is normally based around specialist amphibious ships, most notably , the largest ship in the British fleet until she was decommissioned and sold to Brazil in 2018. Ocean was designed and built to accommodate an embarked commando and its associated stores and equipment. The strategy of the ATG is to wait "beyond the horizon" and then deploy swiftly as directed by HM Government. The whole amphibious force is intended to be self-sustaining and capable of operating without host-nation support. The concept was successfully tested in operations in Sierra Leone.

Commando Helicopter Force

The Commando Helicopter Force (CHF) forms part of the Fleet Air Arm. It comprises three helicopter squadrons and is commanded by the Joint Helicopter Command. It consists of both Royal Navy (RN) and Royal Marines personnel. RN personnel need not be commando trained. The CHF is neither under the permanent control of 3 Commando Brigade nor that of the Commandant General Royal Marines, but rather is allocated to support Royal Marines units as required. It uses both Merlin HC4/4A medium-lift and Wildcat AH1 light transport/reconnaissance helicopters to provide aviation support for the Royal Marines.

Future Commando Force (FCF) Programme

On 11 April 2017 the First Sea Lord, Admiral Sir Philip Jones, announced that the Royal Marines Commandos were to be restructured, and will be capable of deploying on special operations as part of the Future Commando Force (FCF) Programme. Indeed, the Ministry of Defence has also said that under the FCF programme, the Royal Marines Commandos will take on many of the traditional tasks of the SAS and SBS, alongside a new Army Ranger Regiment. As part of this programme, Navy Command is also creating the staff and intellectual horsepower for a land littoral strike division programme. An example of the FCF was depicted by young engineering graduates from the UK Naval Engineering Science and Technology forum (UKNEST). There will be two Littoral Response Groups: One based East of Suez, one based in the High North. On 27 June 2020, the Royal Marines announced they will adopt a new uniform with the MultiCam camouflage instead of the MTP camo.

Selection and training

Royal Marine Commandos are required to undergo the longest and one of the most physically demanding specialist infantry training courses in the world. Recruit training lasts for 36 weeks for Royal Marine Commandos and 64 weeks for Royal Marine Commando Officers. Potential recruits must be aged 16 to 32 (18 to 25 for Commissioned Officers). Applicants must undertake a series of interviews, medical tests, an eye/sight test, psychometric tests, a PJFT (Pre-joining fitness test), a CPC (Candidate Preparation Course), and a ROP (Recruit Orientation Phase). If a potential recruit passes these phases, then they will get selected for a place in recruit training. Potential officers undertake a POC (Potential Officer Course) instead of the CPC (Candidate Preparation Course) – both of which take place at the Commando Training Centre Royal Marines (CTCRM) in Lympstone, Devon. Officers must also take the Admiralty Interview Board (AIB). Upon passing the three-day course, recruits then start basic recruit training (RT) at CTCRM. A large proportion of training is carried out on Dartmoor's inhospitable terrain and Woodbury Common woodland.

Throughout recruit training, Royal Marines Commando recruits learn and develop a vast amount of knowledge and warfighting skills such as weapons handling, marksmanship, proficiency with a variety of different firearms and weapon systems, unarmed and armed close quarters combat (CQC), develop elite levels of physical fitness and mental resilience, demolition, reconnaissance, small team tactics, small boat operations, breaching, raiding, direct action, SERE training, fieldcraft skills such as camouflage and stalking, survival skills, bushcraft, mountaineering, fast-roping (helicopter), abseiling, vertical assault, underwater escape, chemical biological radiological nuclear (CBRN) training, military communications and signals, map reading and navigation, leadership and teamwork skills, first aid, patrolling and sentry duty, amphibious landings training, personal administration, and marching and parade ground skills.

The best recruit to finish training is awarded the Kings Badge. King George V directed that his Royal Cypher, surrounded by a laurel wreath, would be known as the King's Badge, and would be awarded to the best all round recruit in the King's Squad, provided that he was worthy of the honour. The badge was to be carried on the left shoulder, and worn in every rank. The King's Badge is not awarded to every squad, and is only presented if a recruit measures up to the very exacting standards required.

Throughout their career, a Royal Marine Commando can specialise in a number of different roles upon completion of their respective courses after spending one to two years as a general duties (GD) rifleman at a unit. Examples of some specialisations and different courses includes the mountain leader (ML), physical training instructor (PTI), Assault Engineer (AE), Royal Marines police (RMP), sniper (S), medical assistant (MA), pilot, reconnaissance operator (RO), drill instructor (DL), driver (D), clerk (C), signaller (SI), combat intelligence (CI), armourer (A), and heavy weapons (HW). Royal Marines can also apply for swimmer canoeist/Special Boat Service selection (SBS) or any other branch of the UKSF. All Royal Marines will also conduct training exercises on differing military skills on a regular basis including development in mountain, arctic, jungle, amphibious and desert warfare. They can also be involved in exchange training programs with other countries' forces – particularly the United States Marine Corps and the Netherlands Marine Corps/Korps Mariniers.

Museum
The Royal Marines Museum (established in October 1958) is an institution dedicated to the history of the Royal Marines. In 2011, it became part of the National Museum of the Royal Navy, which has since been the executive public body of the museum in the Ministry of Defence. It will soon be moving from Eastney Barracks to Portsmouth Dockyard.

Customs and traditions

The Royal Marines have a proud history and unique traditions. With the exceptions of "Gibraltar" and the laurel wreath for the Battle of Belle Island, their colours (flags) do not carry battle honours in the manner of the regiments of the British Army or of the US Marine Corps, but rather the "globe itself" as a symbol of the Corps.

The heraldic crest of the Royal Marines commemorates the history of the Corps. The Lion and Crown denotes a Royal regiment. King George III conferred this honour in 1802 "in consideration of the very meritorious services of the Marines in the late war." The "Great Globe itself" was chosen in 1827 by King George IV in place of battle honours to recognise the Marines' service and successes in multiple engagements in every quarter of the world. The laurels are believed to honour the gallantry they displayed during the investment and capture of Belle Isle, off Lorient, in April–June 1761. The word Gibraltar refers to the Capture of Gibraltar by a force of Anglo-Dutch Marines in 1704 and the subsequent defence of the strategic fortress throughout a nine-month siege against a numerically superior Franco-Spanish force. Their determination and valour throughout the siege led to a contemporary report published in The Triumphs of Her Majesty's Arms in 1707 to announce:

There are no other battle honours displayed on the colours of the four battalion-sized units of the current Corps. The Latin motto "Per Mare Per Terram" translates into English as "By Sea By Land". Believed to have been first used in 1775, this motto describes the Royal Marines ability in fighting both afloat on-board ships of the Royal Navy as well as ashore in their many land engagements. The fouled anchor, incorporated into the emblem in 1747, is the badge of the Lord High Admiral, and shows that the Corps is part of the Naval Service.

The regimental quick march of the Corps is "A Life on the Ocean Wave", while the slow march is the march of the Preobrazhensky Regiment, awarded to the Corps by Admiral of the Fleet Earl Mountbatten of Burma on the occasion of the Corps's tercentenary in 1964. Lord Mountbatten was Life Colonel Commandant of the Royal Marines until his murder by the IRA in 1979.

The Royal Marines are allowed by the Lord Mayor of the City of London to march through the City as a regiment in full array. This dates to the charter of Charles II that allowed recruiting parties of the Admiral's Regiment of 1664 to enter the City with drums beating and colours flying.

Uniforms
Modern Royal Marines uniforms are broadly similar to British Army uniforms but include a number of distinctive uniform items. These include the green "Lovat" shade of service dress uniform; the green beret (for those who have passed the commando course) or navy blue beret (for those who have not) with a scarlet patch behind the badge; dark blue parade dress worn with either the white Wolseley Pattern Helmet (commonly referred to as "pith helmet") or white and red peaked cap; the scarlet and blue mess dress for officers and senior non-commissioned officers; and the white hot-weather uniform of the Band Service.

For historical information regarding Marine uniforms, see Uniforms of the Royal Marines.

Ranks and insignia

Associations with other regiments and marine corps 
 Argyll and Sutherland Highlanders Early connections date from Balaclava in the Crimean War and Lucknow during the Indian Rebellion of 1857, but the main association stems from World War II. In July 1940, after the fall of Dunkirk, the 5th Battalion, Argyll and Sutherland Highlanders served with the Royal Marine Brigade for over a year. They formed what became known as 'The Plymouth Argylls', after the association football team, since both ships were Plymouth manned. Most of the Highlanders and Marines who survived the bitter fighting were taken prisoner by the Japanese. The Royal Marines inter-unit rugby football trophy is the 'Argyll Bowl', presented to the Corps by the Regiment in 1941.
 Princess of Wales's Royal Regiment The fore-bearer regiments of the Princess of Wales's Royal Regiment, 31st (Huntingdonshire) Regiment of Foot was initially raised as amphibious troops. They served as Marines for a period. To this day one officer from the Royal Marines serves with the PWRR and Vice Versa. Also the Royal Marine Lanyard is worn by all ranks in Service Dress and Number 2 Dress uniform and barrack dress of PWRR.
 United States Marine Corps The Royal Marines and the United States Marine Corps have trained together or exchanged training on multiple occasions, sometimes as mixed units to further build cooperation. In 2018, the Royal Marines won a friendly boxing tournament contested by fighters from both corps at the Royal Lancaster Hotel in London broadcast by Sky Sports.
 Barbados Defence Force Close links have existed between the Royal Marines and the Barbados Defence Force since 1985 when a bond was established following a series of cross-training exercises in the Caribbean. The Alliance was approved by HM the Queen in 1992.
 Netherlands Marine Corps The Royal Marines have close links with the Royal Netherlands Marine Corps, with whom they conduct NATO exercises throughout the year. Formed during the Anglo-Dutch Wars in 1665, the Dutch Marines distinguished themselves in raids on the English coast, where it is likely they met their future counterparts. Units of the Royal Netherlands Marine Corps work in close co-operation with 3 Commando Brigade of the Royal Marines. Operational units of the Royal Netherlands Marine Corps are fully integrated into this brigade. This integration is known as the United Kingdom-Netherlands Landing Force and is a component of the United Kingdom-Netherlands Amphibious Force as a key strike force during the Cold War to strengthen the Nordic area.
 French 9th Marine Infantry Brigade (former 9th Light Armoured Marine Brigade) The 9th Marine Infantry Brigade (9e BIMa) is a Marine infantry brigade which is one of the two designated amphibious brigades in France. It is unique in being the only 'All Marine' Brigade in the French Army; the other amphibious brigade, 6th Light Armoured Brigade (6e BLB), is composed of a mix of cap badges. 9e BIMa is also a light armoured brigade, formed of two Marine infantry regiments (2e RIMa and 3e RIMa — ) and a tank battalion.

See also
 Royal Marines selection and training
 Royal Marines Reserve
 Royal Marines Museum
 Royal Marines Cadets
 Royal Marines Volunteer Cadet Corps
 RM Turnchapel
 List of active Royal Marines military watercraft
 List of serving senior officers of the Royal Marines

Notes

References

Bibliography
 
 

Dutton, Jim. "The Royal Marines Today," RUSI Journal, Vol. 145, No. 4, August 2000, 21-24.

External links 

 
 Royal Marines History website
 Royal Marines Band Service website
 Royal Marines Volunteer Cadet Corps (RMVCC) Portsmouth website
 Download Royal Marines Registers of Service (1842–1925). The National Archives official website
 Potential Royal Marines Commando forum (for men wishing to join)
 "Rum Ration": The Navy Network – unofficial website for the Royal Navy, Royal Marines, and Royal Fleet Auxiliary
 Royal Marines Museum  website
 Marine Society website
 Royal Navy ranks, professions, and trades in World War 2, including Royal Marines
 Royal Navy Battle Honours including Royal Marine Corps Memorable Dates, 1939–1945

 
1664 establishments in England
1755 establishments in Great Britain
British Armed Forces
Commandos (United Kingdom)
M
Military of the United Kingdom
Military units and formations established in 1664
Military units and formations in Plymouth, Devon
Military units and formations of Great Britain in the American Revolutionary War
Ministry of Defence (United Kingdom)
United K